Sur (Nsur), or Tapshin, is a minor Plateau language of Tapshin village in Bauchi State, Nigeria.

There are no more than 3,000 to 4,000 speakers. Sur speakers are surrounded by Ngas speakers, who refer to the Sur as Dishili. Nevertheless, Sur is a vital language still being passed onto children, and is not immediately endangered.

References

Tarokoid languages
Languages of Nigeria